In physics, electromagnetism is an interaction that occurs between particles with electric charge via electromagnetic fields. The electromagnetic force is one of the four fundamental forces of nature. It is the dominant force in the interactions of atoms and molecules. Electromagnetism can be thought of as a combination of electrostatics and magnetism, two distinct but closely intertwined phenomena. Electromagnetic forces occur between any two charged particles, causing an attraction between particles with opposite charges and repulsion between particles with the same charge, while magnetism is an interaction that occurs exclusively between charged particles in relative motion. These two effects combine to create electromagnetic fields in the vicinity of charge particles, which can accelerate other charged particles via the Lorentz force. At high energy, the weak force and electromagnetic force are unified as a single electroweak force.

The electromagnetic force is responsible for many of the chemical and physical phenomena observed in daily life.  The electrostatic attraction between atomic nuclei and their electrons holds atoms together. Electric forces also allow different atoms to combine into molecules, including the macromolecules such as proteins that form the basis of life. Meanwhile, magnetic interactions between the spin and angular momentum magnetic moments of electrons also play a role in chemical reactivity; such relationships are studied in spin chemistry. Electromagnetism also plays a crucial role in modern technology: electrical energy production, transformation and distribution, light, heat, and sound production and detection, fiber optic and wireless communication, sensors, computation, electrolysis, electroplating and mechanical motors and actuators.

Electromagnetism has been studied since ancient times. Many ancient civilizations, including the Greeks and the Mayans created wide-ranging theories to explain lightning, static electricity, and the attraction between magnetized pieces of iron ore. However, it wasn't until the late 18th century that scientists began to develop a mathematical basis for understanding the nature of electromagnetic interactions. In the 18th and 19th centuries, prominent scientists and mathematicians such as Coulomb, Gauss and Faraday developed namesake laws which helped to explain the formation and interaction of electromagnetic fields. This process culminated in the 1860s with the discovery of Maxwell's equations, a set of four partial differential equations which provide a complete description of classical electromagnetic fields. Besides providing a sound mathematical basis for the relationships between electricity and magnetism that scientists had been exploring for centuries, Maxwell's equations also predicted the existence of self-sustaining electromagnetic waves. Maxwell postulated that such waves make up visible light, which was later shown to be true. Indeed,  gamma-rays, x-rays, ultraviolet, visible, infrared radiation, microwaves and radio waves were all determined to be electromagnetic radiation differing only in their range of frequencies.  

In the modern era, scientists have continued to refine the theorem of electromagnetism to take into account the effects of modern physics, including quantum mechanics and relativity. Indeed, the theoretical implications of electromagnetism, particularly the establishment of the speed of light based on properties of the "medium" of propagation (permeability and permittivity), helped inspire Einstein's theory of special relativity in 1905. Meanwhile, the field of quantum electrodynamics (QED) has modified Maxwell's equations to be consistent with the quantized nature of matter. In QED, the electromagnetic field is expressed in terms of discrete particles known as photons, which are also the physical quanta of light. Today, there exist many problems in electromagnetism that remain unsolved, such as the existence of magnetic monopoles and the mechanism by which some organisms can sense electric and magnetic fields.

History of the theory

Originally, electricity and magnetism were considered to be two separate forces. This view changed with the publication of James Clerk Maxwell's 1873 A Treatise on Electricity and Magnetism in which the interactions of positive and negative charges were shown to be mediated by one force. There are four main effects resulting from these interactions, all of which have been clearly demonstrated by experiments:
 Electric charges  or  one another with a force inversely proportional to the square of the distance between them: unlike charges attract, like ones repel.
 Magnetic poles (or states of polarization at individual points) attract or repel one another in a manner similar to positive and negative charges and always exist as pairs: every north pole is yoked to a south pole.
 An electric current inside a wire creates a corresponding circumferential magnetic field outside the wire. Its direction (clockwise or counter-clockwise) depends on the direction of the current in the wire.
 A current is induced in a loop of wire when it is moved toward or away from a magnetic field, or a magnet is moved towards or away from it; the direction of current depends on that of the movement.
In April 1820, Hans Christian Ørsted observed that an electrical current in a wire caused a nearby compass needle to move. At the time of discovery, Ørsted did not suggest any satisfactory explanation of the phenomenon, nor did he try to represent the phenomenon in a mathematical framework. However, three months later he began more intensive investigations. Soon thereafter he published his findings, proving that an electric current produces a magnetic field as it flows through a wire. The CGS unit of magnetic induction (oersted) is named in honor of his contributions to the field of electromagnetism.

His findings resulted in intensive research throughout the scientific community in electrodynamics. They influenced French physicist André-Marie Ampère's developments of a single mathematical form to represent the magnetic forces between current-carrying conductors. Ørsted's discovery also represented a major step toward a unified concept of energy.

This unification, which was observed by Michael Faraday, extended by James Clerk Maxwell, and partially reformulated by Oliver Heaviside and Heinrich Hertz, is one of the key accomplishments of 19th-century mathematical physics. It has had far-reaching consequences, one of which was the understanding of the nature of light. Unlike what was proposed by the electromagnetic theory of that time, light and other electromagnetic waves are at present seen as taking the form of quantized, self-propagating oscillatory electromagnetic field disturbances called photons. Different frequencies of oscillation give rise to the different forms of electromagnetic radiation, from radio waves at the lowest frequencies, to visible light at intermediate frequencies, to gamma rays at the highest frequencies.

Ørsted was not the only person to examine the relationship between electricity and magnetism. In 1802, Gian Domenico Romagnosi, an Italian legal scholar, deflected a magnetic needle using a Voltaic pile. The factual setup of the experiment is not completely clear, nor if current flowed across the needle or not. An account of the discovery was published in 1802 in an Italian newspaper, but it was largely overlooked by the contemporary scientific community, because Romagnosi seemingly did not belong to this community.

An earlier (1735), and often neglected, connection between electricity and magnetism was reported by a Dr. Cookson. The account stated:A tradesman at Wakefield in Yorkshire, having put up a great number of knives and forks in a large box ...  and having placed the box in the corner of a large room, there happened a sudden storm of thunder, lightning, &c.  ... The owner emptying the box on a counter where some nails lay, the persons who took up the knives, that lay on the nails, observed that the knives took up the nails. On this the whole number was tried, and found to do the same, and that, to such a degree as to take up large nails, packing needles, and other iron things of considerable weight ... E. T. Whittaker suggested in 1910 that this particular event was responsible for lightning to be "credited with the power of magnetizing steel; and it was doubtless this which led Franklin in 1751 to attempt to magnetize a sewing-needle by means of the discharge of Leyden jars."

Fundamental forces 

The electromagnetic force is one of the four known fundamental forces and the second strongest (after the strong nuclear force), operating with infinite range; The other fundamental forces are:
 the strong nuclear force, which binds quarks to form nucleons, and binds nucleons to form nuclei; it is the strongest of the four known fundamental forces, but operates only at short range;
 the weak nuclear force, which binds to all known particles in the Standard Model, and causes certain forms of radioactive decay; it is the second weakest of the four fundamental forces and, like the strong nuclear force, operates only at short range (note that in particle physics, the electroweak interaction is the unified description of two of the four known fundamental interactions of nature: electromagnetism and the weak interaction);
 the gravitational force is the only one of the four fundamental forces that is not part of the Standard Model of particle physics; while by far the weakest of the four fundamental forces, the gravitational force, along with the electromagnetic force, operates at infinite range.
All other forces (e.g., friction, contact forces) are derived from these four fundamental forces and they are known as non-fundamental forces.

Roughly speaking, all the forces involved in interactions between atoms can be explained by the electromagnetic force acting between the electrically charged atomic nuclei and electrons of the atoms. Electromagnetic forces also explain how these particles carry momentum by their movement. This includes the forces we experience in "pushing" or "pulling" ordinary material objects, which result from the intermolecular forces that act between the individual molecules in our bodies and those in the objects. The electromagnetic force is also involved in all forms of chemical phenomena.

A necessary part of understanding the intra-atomic and intermolecular forces is the effective force generated by the momentum of the electrons' movement, such that as electrons move between interacting atoms they carry momentum with them. As a collection of electrons becomes more confined, their minimum momentum necessarily increases due to the Pauli exclusion principle. The behaviour of matter at the molecular scale including its density is determined by the balance between the electromagnetic force and the force generated by the exchange of momentum carried by the electrons themselves.

Classical electrodynamics

In 1600, William Gilbert proposed, in his De Magnete, that electricity and magnetism, while both capable of causing attraction and repulsion of objects, were distinct effects. Mariners had noticed that lightning strikes had the ability to disturb a compass needle. The link between lightning and electricity was not confirmed until Benjamin Franklin's proposed experiments in 1752 were conducted on 10May 1752 by Thomas-François Dalibard of France using a  iron rod instead of a kite and he successfully extracted electrical sparks from a cloud.

One of the first to discover and publish a link between man-made electric current and magnetism was Gian Romagnosi, who in 1802 noticed that connecting a wire across a voltaic pile deflected a nearby compass needle. However, the effect did not become widely known until 1820, when Ørsted performed a similar experiment. Ørsted's work influenced Ampère to produce a theory of electromagnetism that set the subject on a mathematical foundation.

A theory of electromagnetism, known as classical electromagnetism, was developed by various physicists during the period between 1820 and 1873 when it culminated in the publication of a treatise by James Clerk Maxwell, which unified the preceding developments into a single theory and discovered the electromagnetic nature of light. In classical electromagnetism, the behavior of the electromagnetic field is described by a set of equations known as Maxwell's equations, and the electromagnetic force is given by the Lorentz force law.

One of the peculiarities of classical electromagnetism is that it is difficult to reconcile with classical mechanics, but it is compatible with special relativity. According to Maxwell's equations, the speed of light in vacuum is a universal constant that is dependent only on the electrical permittivity and magnetic permeability of free space. This violates Galilean invariance, a long-standing cornerstone of classical mechanics. One way to reconcile the two theories (electromagnetism and classical mechanics) is to assume the existence of a luminiferous aether through which the light propagates. However, subsequent experimental efforts failed to detect the presence of the aether. After important contributions of Hendrik Lorentz and Henri Poincaré, in 1905, Albert Einstein solved the problem with the introduction of special relativity, which replaced classical kinematics with a new theory of kinematics compatible with classical electromagnetism. (For more information, see History of special relativity.)

In addition, relativity theory implies that in moving frames of reference, a magnetic field transforms to a field with a nonzero electric component and conversely, a moving electric field transforms to a nonzero magnetic component, thus firmly showing that the phenomena are two sides of the same coin. Hence the term "electromagnetism". (For more information, see Classical electromagnetism and special relativity and Covariant formulation of classical electromagnetism.)

Extension to nonlinear phenomena
The Maxwell equations are linear, in that a change in the sources (the charges and currents) results in a proportional change of the fields. Nonlinear dynamics can occur when electromagnetic fields couple to matter that follows nonlinear dynamical laws. This is studied, for example, in the subject of magnetohydrodynamics, which combines Maxwell theory with the Navier–Stokes equations.

Quantities and units

Here is a list of common units related to electromagnetism:

 ampere (electric current)
 coulomb (electric charge)
 farad (capacitance)
 henry (inductance)
 ohm (resistance)
 siemens (conductance)
 tesla (magnetic flux density)
 volt (electric potential)
 watt (power)
 weber (magnetic flux)

In the electromagnetic CGS system, electric current is a fundamental quantity defined via Ampère's law and takes the permeability as a dimensionless quantity (relative permeability) whose value in vacuum is unity. As a consequence, the square of the speed of light appears explicitly in some of the equations interrelating quantities in this system.

Formulas for physical laws of electromagnetism (such as Maxwell's equations) need to be adjusted depending on what system of units one uses. This is because there is no one-to-one correspondence between electromagnetic units in SI and those in CGS, as is the case for mechanical units. Furthermore, within CGS, there are several plausible choices of electromagnetic units, leading to different unit "sub-systems", including Gaussian, "ESU", "EMU", and Heaviside–Lorentz. Among these choices, Gaussian units are the most common today, and in fact the phrase "CGS units" is often used to refer specifically to CGS-Gaussian units.

Applications 
The study of electromagnetism informs electric circuits and semiconductor devices' construction.

See also

 Abraham–Lorentz force
 Aeromagnetic surveys
 Computational electromagnetics
 Double-slit experiment
 Electromagnet
 Electromagnetic induction
 Electromagnetic wave equation
 Electromagnetic scattering
 Electromechanics
 Geophysics
 Introduction to electromagnetism
 Magnetostatics
 Magnetoquasistatic field
 Optics
 Relativistic electromagnetism
 Wheeler–Feynman absorber theory

References

Further reading

Web sources

Textbooks

General coverage

External links 

 Magnetic Field Strength Converter
 Electromagnetic Force – from Eric Weisstein's World of Physics

 
 
Fundamental interactions